MinnPost is a nonprofit online newspaper in Minneapolis, founded  in 2007, with a focus on Minnesota news.

Funding
MinnPost's initial funding of $850,000 came from four families: John and Sage Cowles, Lee Lynch and Terry Saario, Joel and Laurie Kramer, and David and Vicki Cox. The Knight Foundation in Miami, Florida initially donated US$250,000 and in 2008 subsequently granted additional funds to expand local reporting.

Major foundation support has come from the Blandin Foundation, Otto Bremer Foundation, Bush Foundation, Carolyn Foundation, Central Corridor Funders Collaborative, Ethics and Excellence in Journalism Foundation, John S. and James L. Knight Foundation, Martin and Brown Foundation, Joyce Foundation, The McKnight Foundation, The Minneapolis Foundation, Pohlad Family Foundation, and The Saint Paul Foundation.

In March 2014, MinnPost announced that, thanks to a grant from the John S. and James L. Knight Foundation, MinnPost and online news site Voice of San Diego "will engage in a two-stage process over the next two-plus years: First, to develop systems and adopt best practices that manage member information and facilitate significant membership growth. And second, to test out and then adopt new products, services and experiences for members that will make thousands more readers want to be members rather than non-paying readers. Each organization will receive $600,000 over the next two years."

Content and format
The site does not endorse candidates for office or publish unsigned editorials representing an institutional position. MinnPost encourages broad-ranging, civil discussion from many points of view, subject to the discretion of a moderator.

Content is "politics, government, science, health, culture" and other subjects including the environment, education and the arts. The non-profit model was estimated to save MinnPost about 15% of a traditional newspaper's outlays. The format takes its shape from online newspapers. At first, MinnPost published a print version of about eight pages at the lunch hour to high traffic locations. The print on demand model and print version was discontinued during the newspaper's first year.

The organization is part of a much-discussed trend away from print toward online media. Quoted by Minnesota Public Radio News, Laurie Schwab, executive director of the Online News Association, said in June 2007, 45 percent of the association's 1,100 members "started working at print publications and migrated online".

Personnel
The founding CEO and editor of MinnPost, Joel Kramer, retired in October 2016. On May 1, 2014, Andrew Wallmeyer joined the staff as publisher, reporting to Kramer. Wallmeyer served as CEO until 2020, when Tanner Curl was named MinnPost's executive director. Susan Albright served as managing editor until retiring in 2021. Harry Colbert, Jr., previously of North News and Insight News, was named as the new managing editor.

Andy Putz is MinnPost's editor. Other news staff include Susan Albright (managing editor), Corey Anderson (web editor), Tom Nehil (news editor), and about 25 journalists. Full-time staff writers are columnist Eric Black and reporters Peter Callaghan, Solomon Gustavo, Ashley Hackett, Greta Kaul, and Walker Orenstein.

Board of Directors: Rebecca Shavlik, Chair; Peter Hutchinson, Vice Chair/Treasurer; Jill Field, Past Chair; John Satorius, Secretary; Lee Lynch, Chair Emeritus; Kevin Armstrong, Katie Cole, A.J. Colianni, Fran Davis, Jack Dempsey, Jim Erickson, Nancy Feldman, Diane Hofstede, Tom Horner, Jonathan Kealing, Jay Kiedrowski, Barbara Klaas, Joel Kramer, Laurie Kramer, Glenn Miller, Adair Mosley, Max Musicant, Ann Possis, Kari Ruth, Toya Stewart Downey, Karen Schanfield, Chelle Stoner, and Leslie Suzukamo.

According to Editor & Publisher, opinion pieces — called Community Voices — are signed and nonpartisan.

MinnPost has a news bureau in Washington, D.C.

Writers

 Gregg Aamot
 Eric Black
 Pat Borzi
 Peter Callaghan
 Pamela Espeland

 Doug Grow
 Erin Hinrichs
 Joe Kimball
 Greta Kaul
 Brian Lambert
 Jessica Lee
 Bill Lindeke

 Ron Meador
 Iric Nathanson
 Walker Orenstein
 Susan Perry
 Taryn Phaneuf
 Andy Steiner
 Jim Walsh
 Soloman Gustavo
 Ashley Hackett
 Yasmine Askari

See also

 Media in Minneapolis–St. Paul

References

Further reading

External links
 

Newspapers published in Minnesota
Publications established in 2007
American news websites
Mass media in Minneapolis–Saint Paul
Nonprofit newspapers